The discography of American rapper  YoungBoy Never Broke Again consists of five studio albums, two compilation albums, 25 mixtapes (including six collaborative mixtapes), three extended plays, and 91 singles (including twenty one as a featured artist).

Albums

Studio albums

Compilation albums

Mixtapes

Collaborative mixtapes

Extended plays

Singles

As lead artist

As featured artist

Promotional singles

Other charted and certified songs

Guest appearances

Notes

References

Discographies of American artists
Hip hop discographies